Charles Augustin Sainte-Beuve (23 December 1804 – 13 October 1869) was a French literary critic.

Early life
He was born in Boulogne, educated there, and studied medicine at the Collège Charlemagne in Paris (1824–27).  In 1828, he served in the St Louis Hospital.  Beginning in 1824, he contributed literary articles, the Premier lundis of his collected Works, to the newspaper Globe, and in 1827 he came, by a review of Victor Hugo's Odes et Ballades, into close association with Hugo and the Cénacle, the literary circle that strove to define the ideas of the rising Romanticism and struggle against classical formalism.  Sainte-Beuve became friendly with Hugo after publishing a favourable review of the author's work but later had an affair with Hugo's wife, Adèle Foucher, which resulted in their estrangement.  Curiously, when Sainte-Beuve was made a member of the French Academy in 1845, the ceremonial duty of giving the reception speech fell upon Hugo.

Career
Sainte-Beuve published collections of poems and the partly autobiographical novel Volupté in 1834.  His articles and essays were collected the volumes Port-Royal and Portraits littéraires.

During the rebellions of 1848 in Europe, he lectured at Liège on Chateaubriand and his literary circle.  He returned to Paris in 1849 and began his series of topical columns, Causeries du lundi ('Monday Chats') in the newspaper, Le Constitutionnel.  When Louis Napoleon became Emperor, he made Sainte-Beuve professor of Latin poetry at the Collège de France, but anti-Imperialist students hissed him, and he resigned.

Port-Royal
After several books of poetry and a couple of failed novels, Sainte-Beuve began to do literary research, of which the most important publication resulting is Port-Royal. He continued to contribute to La Revue contemporaine.

Port-Royal (1837–1859), probably Sainte-Beuve's masterpiece, is an exhaustive history of the Jansenist abbey of Port-Royal-des-Champs, near Paris. It not only influenced the historiography of religious belief, i.e., the method of such research, but also the philosophy of history and the history of esthetics.

He was made Senator in 1865, in which capacity he distinguished himself by his pleas for freedom of speech and of the press. According to Jules Amédée Barbey d'Aurevilly, "Sainte-Beuve was a clever man with the temper of a turkey!"  In his last years, he was an acute sufferer and lived much in retirement.

One of Sainte-Beuve's critical contentions was that, in order to understand an artist and his work, it was necessary to understand that artist's biography. Marcel Proust took issue with this notion and repudiated it in a set of essays, Contre Sainte-Beuve ("Against Sainte-Beuve").  Proust developed the ideas first voiced in those essays in À la recherche du temps perdu (In Search of Lost Time).

Reception
In 1880 Friedrich Nietzsche, though an avowed opponent of Sainte-Beuve, prompted the wife of his friend Franz Overbeck, Ida Overbeck, to translate the Causeries du lundi into German. Until then, Sainte-Beuve was never published in German despite his great importance in France, since it was considered representative of a French way of thinking detested in Germany. Ida Overbeck's translation appeared in 1880 under the title Die Menschen des XVIII. Jahrhunderts (Men of the 18th Century). Nietzsche wrote to Ida Overbeck on August 18, 1880: "An hour ago I received the Die Menschen des XVIII. Jahrhunderts, [...] It is just a marvellous book. I think I've cried." Ida Overbeck's translation is an important document of the cultural transfer between Germany and France in a period of strong tension, but it was largely ignored. It was not until 2014 that a critical and annotated edition of this translation appeared in print.

Sainte-Beuve died in Paris, aged 64.

Publications

Non-fiction
 Tableau Historique et Critique de la Poésie Française et du Théâtre Français au XVIe Siècle (2 vols., 1828).
 Port-Royal (5 vols., 1840–1859).
 Portraits Littéraires (3 vols., 1844; 1876–78).
 Portraits Contemporains (5 vols., 1846; 1869–71).
 Portraits de Femmes (1844; 1870).
 Causeries du Lundi (16 vols., 1851–1881).
 Nouveaux Lundis (13 vols., 1863–1870).
 Premiers Lundis (3 vols., 1874–75).
 Étude sur Virgile (1857). 
 Chateaubriand et son Groupe Littéraire (2 vols., 1860).
 Le Général Jomini (1869).
 Madame Desbordes-Valmore (1870).
 M. de Talleyrand (1870).
 P.-J. Proudhon (1872).
 Chroniques Parisiennes (1843–1845 & 1876).
 Les Cahiers de Sainte-Beuve (1876).
 Mes Poisons (1926).

Fiction
 Volupté (1834).
 Madame de Pontivy (1839).
 Christel (1839).
 La Pendule (1880).

Poetry
 Vie, Poésies et Pensées de Joseph Delorme (1829).
 Les Consolations (1830).
 Pensées d'août (1837).
 Livre d'Amour (1843).
 Poésies Complètes (1863).
 Poésies françaises d'une Italienne (1854) by Agathe-Sophie Sasserno, preface by Sainte-Beuve

In English translation
 Portraits of Celebrated Women (1868, trans. Harriet W. Preston).
 Memoirs of Madame Desbordes-Valmore (1873, trans. Harriet W. Preston).
 English Portraits (1875, a selection from Causeries du Lundi).
 Monday-chats (1877, trans. William Matthews)
 Essays on Men and Women (1890, trans. William Matthews and Harriet W. Preston).
 Essays (1890, trans. Elizabeth Lee).
 Portraits of Men (1891, trans. Forsyth Edeveain).
 Portraits of Women (1891, trans. Helen Stott).
 Select Essays of Sainte-Beuve (1895, trans. Arthur John Butler).
 The Prince de Ligne (1899, trans. Katharine Prescott Wormeley).
 The Correspondence of Madame, Princess Palatine (1899, trans. Katharine Prescott Wormeley).
 The Essays of Sainte-Beuve (1901, ed. William Sharp).
 Memoirs and Letters of Cardinal de Bernis (1902, trans. Katharine Prescott Wormeley).
 Causeries du lundi (1909–11, 8 vols., trans. E.J. Trechmann).
 Selected Essays (1963, trans. & ed. Francis Steegmuller and Norbert Guterman).
 Volupté: The Sensual Man (1995, trans. Marilyn Gaddis Rose).

References

Citations

Sources 

 Nicolson, Harold George (1957). Sainte-Beuve. London: Constable.
 Williams, Roger L. (1957). "Sainte-Beuve, Sultan of Literature". In: Gaslight and Shadow: The World of Napoleon III. New York: Macmillan.

Further reading 

 Arnold, Matthew (1910). "Sainte-Beuve." In: Essays in Criticism. Boston: The Ball Publishing Co., pp. 137–152.
 Babbitt, Irving (1912). The Masters of Modern French Criticism. Boston and New York: Houghton Mifflin Company, pp. 79–188.
 Barlow, Norman H. (1964). Sainte-Beuve to Baudelaire: A Poetic Legacy. Durham, N.C.: Duke University Press.
 Birrell, Augustine (1892). "Sainte-Beuve." In: Res Judicatæ. New York: Charles Scribner's Sons, pp. 298–308.
 Calvert, George H. (1875). "Sainte-Beuve, the Critic." In: Essays Æsthetical. Boston: Lee and Shepard, pp. 158–197.
 Chadbourne, Richard M. (1977). Charles-Augustin Sainte-Beuve. Boston: Twayne Publishers.
 Dowden, Edward (1902). "Literary Criticism in France." In: New Studies in Literature. London: Kegan Paul, Trench, Trübner & Co., pp. 388–418.
 Compagnon, Antoine (1995). "Sainte-Beuve and the Canon," MLN, Vol. 110, No. 5, French Issue, pp. 1188–1199.
 Guérard, Albert Léon (1913). "Critics and Historians: Sainte-Beuve, Taine." In: French Prophets of Yesterday. New York: D. Appleton and Company, pp. 201–223.
 Harper, George McLean (1897). "Sainte-Beuve," Scribner's Magazine, Vol. XXII, No. 5, pp. 594–600.
 Harper, George McLean (1901). "Sainte-Beuve." In: Masters of French Literature. New York: Charles Scribner's Sons, pp. 219–275.
 Harper, George McLean (1909). Charles Augustin Sainte-Beuve. Philadelphia and London: J.B. Lippincott Company.
 James, Henry (1880). "Sainte-Beuve," The North American Review, Vol. CXXX, No. 278, pp. 51–69.
 Kirk, John Foster (1866). "Sainte-Beuve," The Atlantic Monthly, Vol. XVII, No. 102, pp. 432–454.
 Knickerbocker, William S. (1932). "Sainte-Beuve," The Sewanee Review, Vol. 40, No. 2, pp. 206–225.
 Lehmann, A.G. (1962). Sainte-Beuve: A Portrait of the Critic, 1804-1842. Oxford: Clarendon Press.
 MacClintock, Lander (1920). Sainte-Beuve's Critical Theory and Practice After 1849. Chicago, Ill.: The University of Chicago Press.
 Marks, Emerson R. (1964). "Sainte-Beuve's Classicism," The French Review, Vol. 37, No. 4, pp. 411–418.
 Mott, Lewis Freeman (1925). Sainte-Beuve. New York: D. Appleton and Company.
 Mulhauser, Ruth E. (1969). Sainte-Beuve and Greco-Roman Antiquity. Cleveland: Press of Case Western Reserve University.
 Nelles, Paul (2000). "Sainte-Beuve between Renaissance and Enlightenment," Journal of the History of Ideas, Vol. 61, No. 3, pp. 473–492.
 Paton, J.B. (1870). "Sainte-Beuve and Renan," The London Quarterly Review, Vol. XXXIII, pp. 457–480.
 Pollak, Gustav (1914). International Perspective in Criticism. New York: Dodd, Mead & Company. 
 Proust, Marcel (1988). Against Sainte-Beuve and Other Essays. London: Penguin.
 Smith, Horatio (1942). "Sainte-Beuve on Science and Human Nature: Jouffroy, Le Play, Proudhon," Modern Language Notes, Vol. 57, No. 7, pp. 592–602.
 Sutcliffe, Emerson Grant (1921). "Sainte-Beuve on Fiction," The South Atlantic Quarterly, Vol. XX, pp. 41–51.
 Switzer, Richard (1960). "Sainte-Beuve and the Ottocento," Italica, Vol. 37, No. 2, pp. 109–117.
 Whitridge, Arnold (1923). "The Personality of Sainte-Beuve," The North American Review, Vol. 217, No. 810, pp. 676–687.
 Whitridge, Arnold (1938). "Matthew Arnold and Sainte-Beuve," PMLA, Vol. 53, No. 1, pp. 303–313.
 "Hugo and Sainte-Beuve," The National Quarterly Review, Vol. XX, 1869, pp. 32–52.
 "M. Sainte-Beuve," The Quarterly Review, Vol. CXIX, 1866, pp. 80–108.
 "Sainte-Beuve," The Edinburgh Review, Vol. CXXXII, 1870, pp. 126–154.

External links 

 
 
 
 What Is a Classic? at Bartleby.com.

1804 births
1869 deaths
People from Boulogne-sur-Mer
French literary critics
19th-century French novelists
Writers from Hauts-de-France
French male novelists
19th-century French male writers
Academic staff of the Collège de France
Members of the Académie Française
Chevaliers of the Légion d'honneur
Burials at Montparnasse Cemetery
French male non-fiction writers